Abdulaziz Sachedina  is Professor and International Institute of Islamic Thought (IIIT) Chair in Islamic Studies at George Mason University in Fairfax, Virginia.

Biography 
He has been a professor for 33 years, beginning in 1975. He annually teaches courses on Classical Islam, Islam in the Modern Age, Islam, Democracy and Human Rights, Islamic Bioethics and Muslim Theology. He was born in Tanzania, his heritage originally is from India. He has an MA/PhD from the University of Toronto and has BA degrees from Aligarh Muslim University in India and Ferdowsi University of Mashad in Iran. He was one of the students of Dr. Ali Shariati in Iran.

In 1997, Grand Ayatollah Lotfollah Safi Golpaygani thanked him for his translation of a book on Imam Mahdi into English, originally written by Ayatollah Ebrahim Amini. The acknowledgement letter was published by the Iranian Hawza magazine.

In 1998, Grand Ayatollah Sistani issued a statement against Sachedina that advised Muslims not to listen to his talks or to ask him questions about religious matters. (See original text in Persian).

In addition to his work at the university, Professor Sachedina has been a consultant to the Department of Defense regarding Middle Eastern affairs and was an adviser to those drafting the Constitution of Iraq that was put into effect in 2005.

He speaks Hindi, Urdu, Persian, Arabic, Gujarati, Swahili, and English.

Bibliography

 The Just Ruler in Shi'ite Islam: The Comprehensive Authority of the Jurist in Imamite Jurisprudence Oxford University Press Inc (USA), 1998, 
 The Islamic Roots of Democratic Pluralism Oxford University Press Inc (USA), 2000, 
 The Islamic World: Past and Present John L. Esposito (Editor), Abdulaziz Abdulhussein Sachedina (Editor): Oxford University Press Inc  (USA), 2004, 
 Islamic Biomedical Ethics Oxford University Press (USA), 2009, 
 Islamic Messianism State Univ of New York Press (USA), 1981, 
 Human Rights and the Conflict of Cultures co-authored with David Little and John Kelsay: South Carolina Press (USA), 1988, 
 Prolegomena to the Qur'an" being trans of Abu al-Qasim al-Khui's Al-Bayan Oxford University Press (USA), 1988
 Recueil de textes du professeur Abdulaziz Sachedina, Editions Publibook (France), 2008, 
 Islamic messianism: the idea of Mahdī in twelver Shīʻism, State University of New York, 1981,

References

External links
Faculty page at George Mason University

1942 births
Living people
Aligarh Muslim University alumni
Ferdowsi University of Mashad alumni
University of Toronto alumni
University of Virginia faculty
American male writers of Indian descent
Shia scholars of Islam
George Mason University faculty
Tanzanian emigrants to the United States
American Shia Muslims
American people of Gujarati descent
Muslim reformers